Jiaxing South railway station is a railway station on the Shanghai–Hangzhou high-speed railway located in Nanhu District, Jiaxing, Zhejiang, People's Republic of China. It is only used for high-speed EMU G and D trains and has four platforms and eight rail lines. Normal-speed trains arrive at and depart from Jiaxing railway station.

It was officially opened on October 26, 2010.

At peak times, the station handles 2300 people per hour.

Connections 
The station is the southern terminus of the Jiaxing Tram. It is also connected to the city by public buses.

References 

Railway stations in Zhejiang
Railway stations in China opened in 2010
Jiaxing